Doliński (feminine: Dolińska; plural: Dolińscy) is a Polish surname. It may refer to:

 Dariusz Doliński (born 1959), Polish psychologist
 Joel Dolinski (born 1975), American football coach
 Katarzyna Dolińska (born 1986), American model
 Leszek Doliński (born 1956), Polish basketball player
 Marianna Dolińska (1891–1928), Polish murderer

See also
 
 Dolinsky (disambiguation)

Polish-language surnames